The Valigeria Franzi was an Italian manufacturer of leather bags and luggage  founded in Milan in 1864 by Rocco Franzi. By the early 20th century, it was a supplier to royalty and nobility. It was listed on the Milan stock exchange from 1905 to 1909. Guccio Gucci worked for the company until he set up Gucci in 1921.

The company mostly used English leather, but also produced some at the Conceria Monzese in Monza, which it owned. This was marketed as "Cuoio Franzi".

In 1967 Franzi manufactured a suitcase, "Partner", designed by Cini Boeri and made from two half-shells of aluminium and ABS resin.

The company went into liquidation in 1978, and a new company, Oreste Franzi & Co., was set up. It finally closed in 1998.

References

Luggage manufacturers
Defunct manufacturing companies of Italy
Defunct leather manufacturers
Manufacturing companies established in 1864
Manufacturing companies disestablished in 1998
Companies formerly listed on the Borsa Italiana
Italian companies established in 1864
Italian companies disestablished in 1998